The 2009 IIHF World U20 Championship Division II took place between December 15 and December 21, 2008 in Miercurea-Ciuc, Romania and between January 10 to January 15 in Logroño, Spain. Teams were divided into two groups, with Group A playing in Romania, and Group B playing in Spain. The winner of each group was promoted to Division I for the 2010 IIHF World U20 Championship, while the last place teams in each group were saved from relegation to Division III for the 2010 IIHF World U20 Championship due to 2009's Division III tournament being cancelled.

Group A 
 December 15 to December 21 in Miercurea-Ciuc, Romania

Group B 
 January 10 to January 15 in Logroño, Spain

 Note: China, though demoted in 2008, took New Zealand's place in this tournament because of financing issues with the team's travel.

References

See also
 2009 World Junior Ice Hockey Championships
 2009 World Junior Ice Hockey Championships - Division I

Junior World Championships - Division II
II
World Junior Ice Hockey Championships – Division II
International ice hockey competitions hosted by Spain
International ice hockey competitions hosted by Romania
2009 in Spanish sport
World
Sport in Logroño